The Ronald Reagan Federal Building and Courthouse at 411 West Fourth Street in Santa Ana, California, is a ten-story  United States federal building and courthouse on  that includes courtrooms, judges chambers, offices and courtroom galleries of the United States District Court for the Central District of California.

References

External links

Francis Krahe: Ronald Reagan Federal Building - photos

Library of Congress: Bill to name building

Federal courthouses in the United States
Courthouses in California
Buildings and structures in Santa Ana, California
Government in Orange County, California
Reagan
Skyscrapers in California
Skyscraper office buildings in California